Andrzej Rozenek (born 17 March 1969) is a Polish journalist and politician. Member of the Sejm for Polish Socialist Party. In 2006-2011 and 2015-2019 he was a deputy editor-in-chief of Nie magazine.

Electoral history 

During his political career he also took part in elections for President of Warsaw receiving 2.3% of votes in 2014 and 1.5% in 2018.

References

1969 births
Living people
People from Warsaw
Democratic Left Alliance politicians
Your Movement politicians
Polish Socialist Party politicians
Members of the Polish Sejm 2011–2015
Members of the Polish Sejm 2019–2023